Kristian Marmor (born 27 February 1987 in Türi) is a retired Estonian professional footballer and current beach soccer player.

Club career

Levadia
Marmor joined Levadia in 2006, having previously played for FC Valga of the Meistriliiga. He is a first-team regular at the club, featuring on an increasingly regular basis.

He retired after the 2008/09 season.

International career
He has represented his home-country in youth teams throughout the years. Marmor made his international debut on 29 May 2009 in a friendly match against Wales.

Personal
He is 1.84 m tall and weighs 80 kg.

References

External links

1987 births
Living people
FC Flora players
FC Valga players
FCI Levadia Tallinn players
Estonia international footballers
Estonian footballers
Estonian beach soccer players
People from Türi
FCI Levadia U21 players
Association football defenders
JK Tervis Pärnu players
Meistriliiga players